Mastrevirus is a genus of ssDNA viruses, in the family Geminiviridae. Mostly monocotyledonous plants serve as natural hosts. They are vectored by planthoppers. There are 45 species in this genus. Diseases associated with this genus include: maize streak virus: maize streak disease (MSD).

Capsid proteins
Mastreviruses have an unusually diverse range of capsid proteins among the Geminiviridae. While all other genera have species with essentially identical proteins (and their producing genetic sequences) among themselves, Mastrevirus has seven protein clusters and three species that each constitute their own.

Taxonomy
The following species are recognized:

Axonopus compressus streak virus (ACSV)
Bromus catharticus striate mosaic virus
Camellia chlorotic dwarf-associated virus (CaCDaV)
Citrus chlorotic dwarf-associated virus (CCDaV)
Chickpea chlorosis Australia virus
Chickpea chlorosis virus
Chickpea chlorotic dwarf virus
Chickpea redleaf virus
Chickpea redleaf virus 2
Chickpea yellow dwarf virus
Chickpea yellows virus
Chloris striate mosaic virus
Digitaria ciliaris striate mosaic virus
Digitaria didactyla striate mosaic virus
Digitaria streak virus
Dragonfly-associated mastrevirus (DfasMV)
Eleusine indica associated virus
Eragrostis minor streak virus (EMSV)
Eragrostis streak virus
Grapevine geminivirus (GraGV)
Juncus maritimus-associated virus (JmaV)
Limeum africanum-associated virus (LaaV)
Maize streak dwarfing virus
Maize streak Reunion virus
Maize streak virus
Maize striate mosaic virus
Melenis repens associated virus
Miscanthus streak virus
Mulberry crinkle-associated virus (MCaV)
Miscanthus streak virus (MiSV)
Maize streak Reunion virus (MSMV)
Oat dwarf virus
Panicum streak virus
Paspalum dilatatum striate mosaic virus
Paspalum striate mosaic virus
Passion fruit chlorotic mottle virus (PCMoV)
Polygala garcinii-associated virus (PgaV)
Rice latent virus 1 (RLV1)
Rice latent virus 2 (RLV2)
Saccharum streak virus
Sorghum arundinaceum associated virus
Sporobolus striate mosaic virus 1 (SSMV1)
Sporobolus striate mosaic virus 2 (SSMV2)
Sugarcane chlorotic streak virus
Sugarcane streak Egypt virus
Sugarcane streak Reunion virus
Sugarcane streak virus
Sugarcane striate virus
Sugarcane striate virus A (SStV-A)
Sugarcane striate virus D (SStV-D)
Sugarcane white streak virus (SWSV)
Sweet potato symptomless virus 1/Sweetpotato symptomless mastrevirus 1 (SpSMV1)Switchgrass mosaic-associated virus (SMaV)Tobacco yellow dwarf virusTomato-associated geminivirus (TaGV)Tomato apical leaf curl virus (ToALCV)Urochloa streak virusWheat dwarf India virusWheat dwarf virusStructure
Viruses in Mastrevirus'' are non-enveloped, with icosahedral geometries, and T=1 symmetry. The diameter is around 22 nm, with a length of 38 nm. Genomes are circular and non-segmented, around 2.6-2.8kb in length.

Life cycle
Viral replication is nuclear. Entry into the host cell is achieved by penetration into the host cell. Replication follows the ssDNA rolling circle model. DNA-templated transcription is the method of transcription. The virus exits the host cell by nuclear pore export, and  tubule-guided viral movement. Mostly monocotyledonous plants serve as the natural host. The virus is transmitted via a vector (leafhopper). Transmission routes are vector and mechanical.

References

External links
 Viralzone: Mastrevirus
 ICTV

Geminiviridae
Virus genera